The 2007 Seattle Seahawks season was the franchise's 32nd season in the National Football League (NFL), sixth season in Qwest Field and the ninth under head coach Mike Holmgren. The team improved on their 9–7 record in 2006 and secured its fourth consecutive NFC West division title and its fifth consecutive playoff appearance. Also, the team set an NFL record for the fewest penalties since the NFL expanded to a 16-game season, with 59. In the playoffs, the Seahawks defeated the Washington Redskins in the wild card round, but fell to Holmgren’s former team, the Green Bay Packers, in the divisional round.

Pro Football Reference argued that the 2007 Seahawks gained the easiest schedule of any 21st century NFL team: they never opposed any team with a better record than 10–6 in any of their sixteen regular season encounters, and played only two opponents with that record. Divisional matchups had the NFC West playing the NFC South and the AFC North, whilst based on common positions from 2006 the Seahawks also opposed the Chicago Bears and the Philadelphia Eagles – both of whom fell to last in stronger divisions.

Punt returner Nate Burleson broke the Seahawks single season punt return yardage record this season with 658 yards.

2007 NFL Draft
The 2007 NFL Draft took place on April 28–29, with the Seahawks picking 55th overall (2nd round), selecting Cornerback Josh Wilson.

Coaching staff and roster

Coaching staff
Head coach Mike Holmgren entered his ninth year with the Seahawks. It is the second to last year on his existing contract.

The Seahawks hired former Atlanta Falcons head coach Jim L. Mora to be the new defensive backs coach and assistant coach to Mike Holmgren. A former player at the University of Washington, Mora is considered a hometown guy.

The new special teams coach was Bruce DeHaven. His previous position was as the special teams coach for the Dallas Cowboys.

Final roster

Team captains
For the 2007 season, the NFL has allowed permanent captains for each team to wear a "C" patch on their right shoulder. The patch is in team colors with four stars under the "C". A gold star is placed on a bar below the "C" signaling how many years (with a maximum of four years) that player has been captain. For the Seahawks, the team captains are:

 Matt Hasselbeck
 Lofa Tatupu
 Mack Strong
 Deon Grant
 Josh Brown
 Niko Koutouvides

Departures
 Defensive end Grant Wistrom instead of having his contract renegotiated following the 2006 season decided to retire.
 Wide Receiver Darrell Jackson was traded to the San Francisco 49ers for the 120th pick in the 4th round of the 2007 NFL Draft.
 Tight end Jerramy Stevens was released following a DUI arrest in Arizona, later he signed with the Tampa Bay Buccaneers.
 Tight end Itula Mili was released in January to make room for wide receiver Ben Obomanu.
 Center Robbie Tobeck retired the day after the loss in the 2006 NFC Divisional Playoff game against the Chicago Bears.

Arrivals
 Defensive end Patrick Kerney signed with the Seahawks after being with the Atlanta Falcons.
 Safeties Deon Grant and Brian Russell signed with Seahawks after being with the Jacksonville Jaguars and Cleveland Browns.

Schedule

Preseason

Regular season

Bold indicates division opponents.
Source: 2007 NFL season results

Postseason

Standings

Game summaries

Preseason

Week P1: at San Diego Chargers

Week P2: at Green Bay Packers

Week P3: vs. Minnesota Vikings

Week P4: vs. Oakland Raiders

Regular season

Week 1: vs. Tampa Bay Buccaneers

The Seahawks began the 2007 campaign at home against its 1976 expansion mate, the Tampa Bay Buccaneers. In the first quarter, Seattle trailed early as Bucs kicker Matt Bryant kicked 38-yard and 32-yard field goals. In the second quarter, Seahawks kicker Josh Brown nailed a 28-yard field goal, then the Seahawks took the lead when RB Shaun Alexander powered in for a 1-yard TD run. After a scoreless third quarter, Seattle sealed the victory with Brown's 46-yard field goal and a 34-yard TD pass from QB Matt Hasselbeck to RB Maurice Morris.

With the win, the Seahawks began a season at 1–0 for the 4th time in the past 5 years.

Week 2: at Arizona Cardinals

Hoping to build off of their home win over the Buccaneers, the Seahawks flew to the University of Phoenix Stadium for a Week 2 divisional duel with the Arizona Cardinals. RB Shaun Alexander sported a cast on his left wrist, the result of a reported sprain suffered in the opening week. In the first quarter, Seattle trailed early as kicker Neil Rackers booted a 28-yard field goal for the only score of the period. In the second quarter, the 'Hawks continued to trail as Cardinals QB Matt Leinart threw a 30-yard TD pass to TE Leonard Pope, along with RB Edgerrin James getting a 17-yard TD run. Down 17–0, the Seahawks would respond just before halftime with QB Matt Hasselbeck completing a 24-yard TD pass to WR Nate Burleson. Arizona quickly moved into field goal range after the Seahawk TD, but Rackers hit the upright from 53 yards as time expired.

In the third quarter, Seattle would come all the way back to tie the game after RB Shaun Alexander finally broke loose for a 16-yard TD run and kicker Josh Brown booted a 28-yard field goal. In the fourth quarter, the Seahawks took the lead with Brown kicking another 28-yard field goal. However, Arizona rallied to tie the game on a Rackers 52-yard field goal. The Seahawks appeared to be driving for the go ahead score when, inside field goal range in the final 2 minutes, an exchange from Hasselbeck to Alexander was fumbled and recovered by the Cardinals. Arizona then drove to the Seahawks' 25-yard line, where Rackers kicked a game-winning 42-yard field goal with 11 seconds left.

With the loss, the Seahawks fell to 1–1 on the young season, and had lost 4 straight divisional games.

Week 3: vs. Cincinnati Bengals

Things got off to a quick start for the Seahawks as rookie Josh Wilson returned the opening kickoff 72 yards to the Bengal 24-yard line. Three plays later, Matt Hasselbeck hit WR Bobby Engram for an 18-yard TD and a 7–0 Seahawks lead. The Bengals were quick to respond, as Bengal QB Carson Palmer hit 6 of his first 7 pass attempts for 90 yards, culminating with an 18-yard touchdown pass to WR T. J. Houshmandzadeh and evening the score at 7–7. After turnovers by each team, Cincinnati K Shayne Graham converted a 43-yard field goal attempt to give the Bengals a 10–7 lead 80 seconds into the second quarter. With 3:06 left in the first half, Seahawk defensive lineman Chartric Darby's heavy pressure on Palmer led to a Deon Grant interception at the Seattle 31-yard line. A few plays later, Hasselbeck hit Deion Branch with a 42-yard touchdown pass and a 14–10 Seahawk lead at halftime.

3:51 into the third quarter, Cincinnati linebacker Lemar Marshall sacked Hasselbeck in the endzone for a safety, cutting the lead to 14–12. Neither team scored again until there was 9:57 left in the game when Graham booted a 24-yard field goal to give Cincinnati its first lead of the second half at 15–14. On the next possession, Hasselbeck moved the Seahawks to the opposition's 6-yard line. WR Nate Burleson was unable to hold on to a pass in the endzone, and the Seahawks settled for a K Josh Brown field goal, reclaiming the lead at 17–15. Palmer then connected with Chad Johnson on two big pass plays late in the fourth quarter, followed by 2 runs by back-up RB Kenny Watson for a Bengal TD. Cincinnati opted to try a 2-point conversion, but CB Jordan Babineaux stopped Watson after a pitch from Palmer. The Bengals led 21–17 when the Seahawks got the ball with 2:42 left in the game. The Seahawks sputtered near mid-field, and faced 4th and 1. RB Shaun Alexander broke through for 22 yards, and Hasselbeck hit Nate Burleson with a 22-yard TD pass on the next play for a 24–21 lead with 1:00 left. Seahawks linebacker Lance Laury forced a fumble during the ensuing kickoff, with FS Deon Grant recovering for Seattle. Two plays later Alexander ran for a first down (and 100 yards on the game), cementing the Seahawk victory and improving their record to 2–1.

Week 4: at San Francisco 49ers

Coming off their home win over the Bengals, the Seahawks flew to Monster Park for an NFC West duel with the San Francisco 49ers. After a scoreless first quarter, the 'Hawks took flight in the second quarter with kicker Josh Brown getting a 23-yard field goal, along with QB Matt Hasselbeck completing a 17-yard TD pass to WR Bobby Engram. Seattle ended the half with Brown kicking a 31-yard field goal.

In the third quarter, the Seahawks went back to work with Hasselbeck completing a 14-yard TD pass to TE Marcus Pollard. The 49ers got their only score of the game with kicker Joe Nedney getting a 43-yard field goal. In the fourth quarter, Seattle wrapped up the game with Brown nailing a 25-yard field goal.

With their first divisional win in five games, the Seahawks improved to 3–1. Fullback Mack Strong played in his 200th game as a Seahawk, becoming only the second player to do so.

Week 5: at Pittsburgh Steelers

Coming off their easy divisional road win over the 49ers, the Seahawks flew to Heinz Field for a Week 5 interconference duel with the Pittsburgh Steelers, in the rematch of Super Bowl XL. However, Seattle was mostly unable to get any offensive rhythm going. Meanwhile, the Steelers ran up and down the field with QB Ben Roethlisberger's 13-yard TD pass to TE Heath Miller and RB Najeh Davenport's 1-yard and 5-yard TD run.

With the loss, the Seahawks fell to 3–2. This would mark Seattle's first shut-out loss since Week 1 of the 2000 season, when the Seahawks lost to the Dolphins 23–0. Head Coach Mike Holmgren would suffer only his second career shutout loss.

Week 6: vs. New Orleans Saints

Hoping to rebound from their road loss to the Steelers, the Seahawks went home for Sunday Night football, as they hosted the winless New Orleans Saints. In the first quarter, Seattle trailed early as a blocked punt would result in New Orleans RB Pierre Thomas returning the loose ball 5 yards for a touchdown, along with the only score of the period. In the second quarter, the 'Hawks continued to trail as Saints QB Drew Brees completed a 3-yard TD pass to TE Eric Johnson, while WR Lance Moore got a 7-yard TD run. The Seahawks would respond with QB Matt Hasselbeck completing a 17-yard TD pass to WR Ben Obomanu. However, New Orleans went back to work with Brees completing a 2-yard TD pass to WR Marques Colston. Seattle would end the half with kicker Josh Brown getting a 52-yard field goal. After a scoreless third quarter, the 'Hawks tried to rally in the fourth quarter, but all they could get was Hasselbeck's 22-yard TD pass to WR Nate Burleson.

With the loss, the Seahawks fell to 3–3.

Week 7: vs. St. Louis Rams

Trying to snap a two-game skid, the Seahawks stayed at home for a Week 7 divisional duel with the winless St. Louis Rams. In the first quarter, Seattle took flight early as QB Matt Hasselbeck completed a 1-yard TD pass to TE Will Heller. The Rams replied with kicker Jeff Wilkins getting a 31-yard field goal. In the second quarter, the 'Hawks increased their lead with kicker Josh Brown getting a 38-yard field goal for the only score of the period.

In the third quarter, the Seahawks continued to pound away as WR Nate Burleson the half's opening kickoff 91 yards for a touchdown. Afterwards, St. Louis got its final score of the game with Wilkins getting a 29-yard field goal. Afterwards, Seattle took control with Brown kicking a 45-yard and a 43-yard field goal. In the fourth quarter, the 'Hawks sealed their victory with Brown nailing a 43-yard field goal, while Hasselbeck and Heller hooked up with each other again on an 11-yard TD pass. Despite offensive problems, Seattle defense recovered two St Louis fumbles, forced 3 Interceptions and 7 sacks (four by second year Darryl Tapp)

With their 5th straight win over the Rams, the Seahawks entered its bye week at 4–3.

Week 9: at Cleveland Browns

Coming off of their bye week, the Seahawks flew to Cleveland Browns Stadium for a Week 9 interconference duel with the Cleveland Browns. In the first quarter, Seattle took flight as QB Matt Hasselbeck completed a 5-yard TD pass to WR Bobby Engram for the only score of the period. In the second quarter, the Browns responded with RB Jamal Lewis getting a 2-yard TD run (with a failed PAT). The Seahawks would reply with Hasselbeck completing a 6-yard TD pass to WR D. J. Hackett, along with WR/PR Nate Burleson returning a punt 94 yards for a touchdown. Cleveland would end the half with kicker Phil Dawson getting a 19-yard field goal.

In the third quarter, the Browns began to fight back with Lewis getting a 1-yard TD run. Seattle's response came from kicker Josh Brown who managed to get a 39-yard field goal. In the fourth quarter, Cleveland continued to fight hard as Lewis got another 2-yard TD run (followed by a failed 2-point conversion). The Seahawks would then increase its lead with Brown kicking a 26-yard field goal. However, the Browns finally took the lead as Lewis got another 1-yard TD run (followed by QB Derek Anderson's 2-point conversion pass to former Seahawk WR Joe Jurevicius). Afterwards, Seattle would force overtime as Brown kicked a 22-yard field goal. In overtime, the Seahawks got the ball to begin the period. However, the drive stalled when Seattle couldn't convert on a 4th & 1. Afterwards, Cleveland responded and ended the game with Dawson's game-winning 25-yard field goal.

With the loss, the Seahawks fell to 4–4.

Week 10: vs. San Francisco 49ers

Hoping to rebound from their overtime road loss to the Browns, the Seahawks went home for an NFC West rematch on Monday Night Football with the San Francisco 49ers. In the first quarter, Seattle took flight as QB Matt Hasselbeck completing a 1-yard TD pass to TE Will Heller, along with kicker Josh Brown nailing a 20-yard field goal. In the second quarter, the Seahawks increased their lead with RB Maurice Morris getting a 6-yard TD run for the only score of the period. After a scoreless third quarter, Seattle sealed the victory and the season-sweep in the fourth quarter with Hasselbeck completing a 10-yard TD pass. This would mark the third straight time that the Seahawks had shut out their opponent on Monday Night Football (5 overall).

With the win, the Seahawks improved to 5–4 and swept the 49ers.

Since 2001, Seattle has won 17 out of 21 contests at home against NFC West opponents.

Week 11: vs. Chicago Bears

Coming off their season-sweeping home win over the 49ers, the Seahawks stayed at home for a Week 11 duel against the Chicago Bears, in the rematch of last year's NFC Divisional game (previously in Chicago).

In the first quarter, Seattle trailed early as Bears RB Cedric Benson got a 43-yard TD run, along with kicker Robbie Gould getting a 31-yard field goal. The Seahawks would get on the board with QB Matt Hasselbeck completing a 19-yard TD pass to WR D. J. Hackett. In the second quarter, the Seahawks took the lead with RB Maurice Morris getting a 19-yard TD run. However, Chicago regained the lead with RB Adrian Peterson getting a 5-yard TD run. Seattle would tie the game kicker Josh Brown getting a 40-yard field goal.

In the third quarter, Seattle retook the lead as Hasselbeck completed a 4-yard TD pass to WR Nate Burleson for the only score of the period. In the fourth quarter, the Bears tried to retaliate as Gould kicked a 47-yard field goal. Afterwards, Seattle pulled away with Brown kicking a 23-yard and a 46-yard field goal. Chicago's final response would be Gould nailing a 48-yard field goal.

With the win, the Seahawks improved to 6–4.

Week 12: at St. Louis Rams

Coming off their home win over the Bears, the Seahawks flew to the Edward Jones Dome for a Week 12 NFC West rematch with the St. Louis Rams. In the first quarter, Seattle trailed as RB Maurice Morris was tackled in his own endzone by Rams NT Adam Carriker for a safety, while RB Steven Jackson got a 53-yard TD run. Afterwards, the Seahawks started to take flight as CB Josh Wilson returned a kickoff 89 yards for a touchdown. Later, St. Louis increased their lead with QB Gus Frerotte completing a 15-yard TD pass to WR Isaac Bruce. In the second quarter, the Rams increased their lead with kicker Jeff Wilkins getting a 23-yard field goal.

In the third quarter, Seattle gathered steam as kicker Josh Brown nailed a 33-yard field goal, while QB Matt Hasselbeck 9-yard TD pass to WR Deion Branch. In the fourth quarter, the Seahawks took the lead with RB Leonard Weaver getting a 5-yard TD run. Later in the game, St. Louis threatened to retake their lead. However, Seattle managed to the Rams out on four-straight downs from inside their own 5-yard line.

With the win, not only did the Seahawks improve to 7–4, but also won their 6th straight game against St. Louis. Seattle even took the lead in the all-time divisional series 10–9.

Week 13: at Philadelphia Eagles

Coming off their road win over the Rams, the Seahawks flew to Lincoln Financial Field for a Week 13 duel with the Philadelphia Eagles. In the first quarter, Seattle took flight after LB Lofa Tatupu intercepted Eagles QB A. J. Feeley on the first play of the game, returning it to the 18-yard line. RB Shaun Alexander cashed in a few plays later with a 2-yard TD run. The Eagles responded with RB Correll Buckhalter breaking free on a 30-yard TD run. Following another Tatupu interception of Feeley, QB Matt Hasselbeck completed a 12-yard TD pass to WR Bobby Engram. Philadelphia would end the period with kicker David Akers nailing a 31-yard field goal. In the second quarter, Seattle drove to the Eagles' 22-yard line, but K Josh Brown missed the field goal attempt. After holding the Eagles to a 3 and out, Nate Burleson returned a punt 36 yards to the Eagles' 43-yard line. On the next play, Hasselbeck completing a short pass to Burleson, who took it 43 yards down the left sideline for a TD. The Eagles would cut the lead to 4 on a Feeley 24-yard TD pass to WR Kevin Curtis, and then they drove to the Seahawks' 1-yard line just before the half. The Seahawks stopped the Eagles 4 times to keep the lead at the half.

In the third quarter, following a Bobby Engram fumble, Philadelphia took the lead as RB Brian Westbrook galloped away on a 29-yard TD run. Later, the Seahawks responded with RB Maurice Morris getting a 45-yard TD run and a 28–24 lead. The teams drove back and forth the rest the game, and the Eagles looked to be on the verge of victory after Westbrook returned a Seattle punt 64 yards to the Seahawks 14-yard line with 1:37 left in the game. However, LB Lofa Tatupu cemented the victory a minute later with his third interception at the 4-yard line.

With the win, the Seahawks improved to 8–4 and held a two-game lead over Arizona in the NFC West.

Tatupu was named NFC Defensive Player of the Week for his 3 interceptions.

Week 14: vs. Arizona Cardinals

Coming off their road win over the Eagles, the Seahawks went home for a Week 14 NFC West rematch with the Arizona Cardinals. In the first quarter, Seattle took flight early with kicker Josh Brown getting a 23-yard field goal, while QB Matt Hasselbeck completed a 7-yard TD pass to WR Nate Burleson. In the second quarter, the Seahawks increased their lead with Hasselbeck completing a 15-yard TD pass to WR Bobby Engram and a 17-yard TD pass to WR Deion Branch. The Cardinals would get on the board as QB Kurt Warner completed a 5-yard TD pass to WR Bryant Johnson. Seattle would end the half with Brown kicking a 41-yard field goal.

In the third quarter, Arizona was starting to make a comeback as Warner completed a 2-yard TD pass to WR Jerheme Urban for the only score of the period. In the fourth quarter, the 'Hawks pulled away as Hasselbeck completed a 3-yard TD pass to TE Marcus Pollard, RB Josh Scobey tackled Cardinals punter Mitch Berger in his endzone for a safety, and CB Marcus Trufant returned an interception 84 yards for a touchdown (with a failed PAT). Arizona tried to mount a comeback as Warner completed an 11-yard TD pass to WR Larry Fitzgerald. Fortunately, Seattle's defense prevented any hopes of a Cardinal comeback from happening.

With the win, not only did the Seahawks improve to 9–4, but they also clinched their 4th-straight NFC West title.

Week 15: at Carolina Panthers

Coming off their division-clinching home win over the Cardinals, the Seahawks flew to Bank of America Stadium for a Week 15 intraconference duel with the Carolina Panthers. The game was scoreless until the fourth quarter when Seattle trailed on the foot of Panthers kicker John Kasay's 53-yard field goal. The Seahawks would respond with kicker Josh Brown getting a 23-yard field goal. However, Carolina began to pull away as Kasay nailed a 37-yard field goal and RB DeAngelo Williams managed to get a 35-yard TD run. Seattle tried to rally as QB Matt Hasselbeck completed a 15-yard TD pass to WR Deion Branch. However, the Panthers' defense held on for the win.

With the loss, the Seahawks fell to 9–5.

Week 16: vs. Baltimore Ravens

Hoping to rebound from their road loss to the Panthers, the Seahawks went home for a Week 16 interconference duel with the Baltimore Ravens. After a scoreless first quarter, the Seahawks took flight in the second quarter with QB Matt Hasselbeck completing a 21-yard TD pass to WR Nate Burleson, along with LB Leroy Hill returning a fumble 20 yards for a touchdown, and Hasselbeck completing a 14-yard TD pass to RB Shaun Alexander.

In the third quarter, Seattle increased its lead with kicker Josh Brown nailing a 42-yard and a 39-yard field goal. In the fourth quarter, the Ravens would get their only score of the period as QB Troy Smith completed a 79-yard TD pass to WR Derrick Mason.

With the win, the Seahawks improved to 10–5.

Week 17: at Atlanta Falcons

Postseason
Seattle entered the postseason as the #3 seed in the NFC.

NFC Wild Card Playoff Game: vs. #6 Washington Redskins

NFC Divisional Playoff Game: at #2 Green Bay Packers

See also
2007 NFL season
2007–08 NFL playoffs

References

Seattle
NFC West championship seasons
Seattle Seahawks seasons
Seattle Seahawks